Cheshmehha (also Romanized as Cheshmehhā) is a village in Mehrabad Rural District, Rudehen District, Damavand County, Tehran Province, Iran. At the 2006 census, its population was 106, in 30 families.

References 

Populated places in Damavand County